Rock Lake is the deepest and largest of all scabland lakes left behind from the Missoula Floods, and holds that distinction for all of eastern Washington. The rest of the shoreline is inaccessible to vehicles, other than a few private properties.

Other towns in the area include Sprague, St. John, and Rosalia, although all are a number of miles away.

Rock Lake receives the majority of its water from Rock Creek, which further downstream is a tributary of the Palouse River, as well as Negro Creek. About half a mile from the boat launch, the lakes characteristic geography can be seen, with its high basalt cliff walls on either side with rock pillars and spires protruding from the bottom of the lake. The steep basalt cliffs and stone pinnacles that can rupture a hull and a lack of shoreline coupled with the wind tunnel effect with the regions notable Palouse winds has led to many deaths on the lake. In addition to the perils in the lake, the banks of the lake are also habitat for rattlesnakes in the spring and summer months.

Recreation
The primary recreation activity on Rock Lake is fishing. Popular sport fishing species in the lake include: Crappie, Brown trout, Bluegill, and Rainbow trout.

Running along the eastern shore of the lake is the John Wayne Pioneer Trail, which is a converted rail trail. This section of trail is now open, completing open access from Idaho to North Bend, Wa with the addition of the rail bridge over the Columbia River near Vantage..

Dam considerations
A dam was first considered at the mouth of Rock Lake in the lake 1930s, and base columns were installed. The idea of a dam was abandoned at that point, because of the difficulty the topography would present.

Recently, interest in building a dam at this site has been renewed. Representatives of the Palouse-Rock Lake Conservation District are interested in having a dam built for the primary purpose of stabilizing water supply to right-holders below the dam by creating a consistent flow throughout the year. The current plans for a dam would impound 110,000-120,000 acre feet of water.

Reference list

Lakes of Washington (state)
Bodies of water of Whitman County, Washington